Noel O'Donovan (6 December 1949 – 13 September 2019) was an Irish actor.

O'Donovan grew up in Cork, Ireland. In the 1960s, he went to London, where worked as a labourer. Soon after, he found work at the Saville Theatre in the West End. In 1970, he returned to Ireland and joined the Abbey Theatre's acting school.

He died in the attentive care of staff at the Mater Hospital in Dublin.

Selective filmography

Film

Television

References

External links

1949 births
2019 deaths
Irish male film actors
Irish male television actors
20th-century Irish male actors
21st-century Irish male actors